Methuen Cove is a cove between Cape Anderson and Cape Whitson on the south coast of Laurie Island, in the South Orkney Islands off Antarctica. It was charted in 1903 by the Scottish National Antarctic Expedition under William Speirs Bruce, who named it after H. Methuen, the accountant of the expedition.

References

Coves of the South Orkney Islands